Tharp Ice Rise is an ice rise, about 1.3 nautical miles (2.4 km) long, located at the ice front (1966) of Larsen Ice Shelf, 15 nautical miles (28 km) east of Cape Fanning, Merz Peninsula, Black Coast. The ice rise was mapped by United States Geological Survey (USGS) from U.S. Navy aerial photographs taken 1966–69. In association with the names of Antarctic oceanographers grouped in this area, named by the United Kingdom Antarctic Place-Names Committee (UK-APC) in 1977 after Marie Tharp, American marine geologist and oceanographer of Lamont-Doherty Geological Observatory, Columbia University, New York.

Ice rises of Antarctica
Bodies of ice of Palmer Land